MET Rishikul Vidyalaya is a private co-educational registered International Cambridge day school in Mumbai, Maharashtra, India which is managed by the Mumbai Educational Trust. The school was established in 2002 and offers the Cambridge Primary Programme, and the Cambridge Curriculum at Secondary 1 and 2. It prepares students for the International General Certificate for Secondary Education). The school also offers AS & A Level in Science and Commerce stream. Chhagan Bhujbal is the chairperson of the school.

System of Education

Pre-School 
The pre-school comprises the Mother Toddler, Nursery, Jr. Kindergarten and Sr. Kindergarten.

Primary school 
The primary school comprises Grades 1-5. The school is a part of the Cambridge International Primary Programme with the AV Team LLC.

Secondary school 
The school follows the Cambridge curriculum in Secondary 1 (Grades 6 to 8) and Secondary 2 (Grades 9 and 10). It prepares students for the International General Certificate for Secondary Education program.

AS & A Level 
The school offers AS & A Levels which are equivalent to 11th and 12th grades. MET Rishikul Vidyalaya is affiliated with the Cambridge International Assessment Examinations.

Student Council 
The school has four houses: Shivaji (Red), Tagore (Green), Gandhi (Yellow) and Ashoka (Blue) which compete for the house cup throughout the year. Each house has a captain and a house teacher.

The council's core positions are: Head Boy and Head Girl. The council is democratic, and changed in July every year.

Events

Annual Day 
The school has an annual day known as 'Anandvan', translating to 'the festival of joy'.

Green Mela 
The PTA members of the school host an annual Green Mela, which is a carnival based around eco-friendly activities and games.

Achievements 
The school is very environmental-friendly and has won the 'Best Performing School Award' by The Energy and Resources Institute and the World Education 'Green Campus Award'. It has won the International School Award from the British Council from 2017-2020. School students are extremely active and keep winning curricular and extra-curricular competitions at state and national level.

References

Cambridge schools in India
International schools in Mumbai